Panenský Týnec is a market town in Louny District in the Ústí nad Labem Region of the Czech Republic. It has about 400 inhabitants.

Sights
Panenský Týnec is mostly known for its abbey complex. It contains the former Abbey of the Order of Saint Clare, unfinished Church of the Virgin Mary with a belfry, and a park.

Other sights include Church of Saint George, built probably in 1318 and baroquely rebuilt after a large fire in 1722.

References

External links

Market towns in the Czech Republic
Populated places in Louny District